Oakleaf Lake is a lake in Nicollet County, in the U.S. state of Minnesota.

Oakleaf Lake was named for H. J. Eckloff, an early settler, his surname Eckloff meaning "oak leaf" in the Swedish language.

See also
List of lakes in Minnesota

References

Lakes of Nicollet County, Minnesota
Lakes of Minnesota